Tritonoturris oxyclathrus is a species of sea snail, a marine gastropod mollusk in the family Raphitomidae.

This species was placed in this genus in 2010 by Baoquan Li, Xinzheng Li, and Richard N. Kilburn.

Description
The length of the shell varies between 17 mm and 31 mm.

The whorls are clathrate by distant longitudinal and revolving lirae, forming nodes at the intersections. The interstices are finely cancellate. The sinus is narrow and deep. The color of the shell is light yellowish brown.

Distribution
This marine species occurs off New Guinea, the Philippines and in the South China Sea.

References

 Martens E. 1880. Conchologische Mittheilungen als Fortsetzung der Novitates Conchologicae. Vol. 1. Cassel: Theodor Fischer.

External links
  Li B.-Q. [Baoquan & Li X.-Z. [Xinzheng] (2014) Report on the Raphitomidae Bellardi, 1875 (Mollusca: Gastropoda: Conoidea) from the China Seas. Journal of Natural History 48(17-18): 999-1025]
 

oxyclathrus
Gastropods described in 1880